Luiz Eduardo da Silva dos Santos (born February 24, 1996), known as Dudu, is a Brazilian footballer who plays for Retrô as a forward.

Career
Dudu joined J1 League club Kashiwa Reysol in 2016.

References

External links

Dudu at ZeroZero

1996 births
Living people
Brazilian footballers
Brazilian expatriate footballers
Kashiwa Reysol players
Clube Náutico Capibaribe players
Associação Atlética Ponte Preta players
Santa Cruz Futebol Clube players
Goiás Esporte Clube players
Clube de Regatas Brasil players
Campeonato Brasileiro Série A players
Campeonato Brasileiro Série C players
J1 League players
Association football forwards
Brazilian expatriate sportspeople in Japan
Expatriate footballers in Japan